The Patterson Homestead is a historic house museum located at 1815 Brown Street in Dayton, Ohio, United States.  It was built in 1816 by American Revolutionary War veteran Colonel Robert Patterson.

The house was built using Federal architecture in several sections over forty years.  In 1953, the house was donated to the city of Dayton and has been used for a variety of purposes.  At present time, the museum has six rooms containing period artifacts and original Patterson family artifacts.

Robert Patterson's grandsons, John Henry Patterson and Frank Jefferson Patterson lived in the house as young children, and would eventually go on to found the National Cash Register Company (now NCR Corporation) in 1884.

The home is listed on the National Register of Historic Places in 1976 and is currently operated by Dayton History.

References

External links
 Dayton History Website

Houses completed in 1816
Historic house museums in Ohio
Houses on the National Register of Historic Places in Ohio
Museums in Dayton, Ohio
National Register of Historic Places in Montgomery County, Ohio
NCR Corporation
Houses in Dayton, Ohio
1816 establishments in Ohio